Bronson Tauakipulu (born 8 January 1996 in Samoa) is a Samoan rugby union player who plays for the Queensland Country in the National Rugby Championship. His playing position is prop. He has signed for the Queensland Country squad in 2019. He is also a Samoan international.

Reference list

External links
Ultimate Rugby profile
itsrugby.co.uk profile

1996 births
Samoan rugby union players
Samoa international rugby union players
Living people
Rugby union props